Martin David Thomas (born 8 June 1952) is a former English cricketer.  Thomas was a right-handed batsman who bowled right-arm off break.  He was born in Altrincham, Cheshire.

Thomas made his debut for Oxfordshire in the 1978 Minor Counties Championship against Buckinghamshire.  Thomas played Minor counties cricket for Oxfordshire from 1978 to 1985, which included 27 Minor Counties Championship matches He made his List A debut against Warwickshire in the 1980 Gillette Cup.  In this match he scored 15 runs before being dismissed by Dilip Doshi. He played a further List A match against Glamorgan in the 1981 NatWest Trophy. In his second match, he scored 7 runs before being dismissed by Malcolm Nash.

References

External links
Martin Thomas at ESPNcricinfo
Martin Thomas at CricketArchive

1952 births
Living people
People from Altrincham
English cricketers
Oxfordshire cricketers
Wiltshire cricketers